Uzbekistan competed at the 2018 Winter Olympics in Pyeongchang, South Korea, from 9 to 25 February 2018, with two competitors in two sports.

Competitors 
The following is the list of number of competitors participating at the Games per sport/discipline.

Alpine skiing 

Uzbekistan qualified one male athlete.

Figure skating 

Uzbekistan qualified one male figure skater, based on its placement at the 2017 World Figure Skating Championships in Helsinki, Finland.

See also
Uzbekistan at the 2017 Asian Winter Games

References

Nations at the 2018 Winter Olympics
2018
Winter Olympics